The Polytechnic University of the Philippines, Maragondon Extension is one of the extension campuses of the university system. It is located in Maragondon, Cavite, Philippines; and was established in 1987.

Undergraduate programs
College of Accountancy (COA)
 Bachelor of Science in Accountancy (BSA)

College of Business (CB)
 Bachelor of Science in Business Administration (BSBA)
 
College of Education (COED)
 Bachelor of Science in Secondary Education Major in English (BSE-English)

College of Engineering (CE)
 Bachelor of Science in Electronics and Communications Engineering (BSECE)
 Bachelor of Science in Mechanical Engineering(BSME)
 Bachelor of Science in Electrical Engineering (BSEE)

College of Technology (CT)
 Diploma in Office Management Technology (DOMT)
 Diploma in Information and Communications Management Technology (DICMT)
 Diploma in Electrical Engineering Technology (DEET)

Graduate Program
 Master in Educational Management (MEM)

External links 
 Polytechnic University of the Philippines – Official website

Universities and colleges in Cavite
Polytechnic University of the Philippines
1987 establishments in the Philippines
Educational institutions established in 1987